Elin Nilsen (born 12 August 1968) is a former Norwegian cross-country skier who competed from 1990 to 2004. She won three silver medals in the 4 × 5 km relay at the Winter Olympics (1992, 1994, 1998). Her best individual Olympic finish was fourth in the 30 km event in both in 1992 and 1998.

Nilsen also won five 4 × 5 km relay medals at the Nordic skiing World Championships with three silvers (1995, 1997, 2001) and two bronzes (1991, 1993). Her best individual finish at the World Championships was fourth in the 15 km event in 1999.

Nilsen won four races in career at all levels from 1994 to 2002

She represented Bossmo & Ytteren IL.

Cross-country skiing results
All results are sourced from the International Ski Federation (FIS).

Olympic Games
 3 medals – (3 silver)

World Championships
 5 medals – (3 silver, 2 bronze)

a.  Cancelled due to extremely cold weather.

World Cup

Season standings

Individual podiums

3 podiums

Team podiums

 2 victories 
 24 podiums

Note:   Until the 1999 World Championships and the 1994 Olympics, World Championship and Olympic races were included in the World Cup scoring system.

References

External links
 
 

1968 births
Living people
Norwegian female cross-country skiers
Olympic cross-country skiers of Norway
Olympic silver medalists for Norway
Cross-country skiers at the 1992 Winter Olympics
Cross-country skiers at the 1994 Winter Olympics
Cross-country skiers at the 1998 Winter Olympics
People from Rana, Norway
Olympic medalists in cross-country skiing
FIS Nordic World Ski Championships medalists in cross-country skiing
Medalists at the 1998 Winter Olympics
Medalists at the 1994 Winter Olympics
Medalists at the 1992 Winter Olympics
Sportspeople from Nordland